The 1971–72 Liga Bet season saw Hapoel Safed, Hapoel Givat Haim, Hapoel Ramla and Hapoel Dimona win their regional divisions and promoted to Liga Alef.

North Division A

North Division B

South Division A

South Division B

References
Tables Maariv, 11.6.72, Historical Jewish Press 
In checkered battle Givat Haim won promotion to Liga Alef Davar, 12.6.72, Historical Jewish Press 

Liga Bet seasons
Israel
3